Santoshpur is a census town in Uluberia II CD Block of Uluberia subdivision in Howrah district in the Indian state of West Bengal. It is a part of Kolkata Urban Agglomeration.

Geography

Demographics
As per 2011 Census of India Santoshpur had a total population of 7,695 of which 3,879 (50%) were males and 3,816 (50%) were females. Population below 6 years was 896. The total number of literates in Santoshpur was 5,757 (84.67% of the population over 6 years).

Santoshpur was part of Kolkata Urban Agglomeration in 2011 census.

 India census, Santoshpur had a population of 7,181. Males constitute 52% of the population and females 48%. Santoshpur has an average literacy rate of 74%, higher than the national average of 59.5%: male literacy is 80%, and female literacy is 69%. In Santoshpur, 12% of the population is under 6 years of age.

References

Cities and towns in Howrah district
Neighbourhoods in Kolkata
Kolkata Metropolitan Area